Charles Previn (January 11, 1888 – September 21, 1973) was an American film composer who was active at Universal in Hollywood during the 1940s and 1950s. Before being based in Hollywood, Previn arranged music for over 100 Broadway productions.

Previn was born in Brooklyn to Henrietta Giballe and the rabbi Morris Previn, who a year earlier had immigrated from Graudenz via Glasgow to the United States. He graduated from Brooklyn High School and obtained a bachelor's degree from Cornell University in 1910. He obtained a master's degree from New York College of Music.

From 1936 to 1944, Previn was musical director at Universal, overseeing everything from horror pictures to Arabian Nights fantasies. He was a cousin of the father of German-born composer, pianist, and conductor André Previn and TV and film director Steve Previn (brothers). He died in Los Angeles, aged 85.

Professional career
 Musician and conductor of vaudeville and musical comedy
 Conductor of the St. Louis Municipal Opera
 Conductor of NBC's Camel Pleasure Hour in 1930, featuring cornetist Bix Beiderbecke
 Conductor on the NBC radio series Silken Strings from 1934 through 1936
 1936–1944 — Musical director, arranger, composer and conductor at Universal. While there, Previn accumulated over 225 films to his credit, including most of Deanna Durbin's films.
 1944 — Previn began working at other studios
 1945–1947 — Previn succeeded Ernö Rapée as music director/conductor of the Radio City Music Hall Symphony
 1947 — Previn returned to Hollywood and worked at Eagle-Lion and MGM
 1947 — Ithaca Conservatory of Music awarded Previn an honorary doctorate
 1953 — Previn retired

While at Universal, Previn composed uncredited stock music for several of the studio's releases.

Partial filmography
 The White Monkey (1925)
 Prescription for Romance (1937)
 The Missing Guest (1938)
 The Witness Vanishes (1939)
 Destry Rides Again (1939; musical director)
 Inside Information (1939)
 Missing Evidence (1939)
 Ex-Champ (1939)
 Who Done It? (1942)
 Arabian Nights (1942)
 He's My Guy (1943)

Awards

Oscar Award
 Best Score (1937) — One Hundred Men and a Girl - Musical Director

Academy Award nominations
 Best Score (1938) — Mad About Music (w. Frank Skinner)
 Best Score (1939) — First Love
 Best Score (1940) — Spring Parade
 Scoring of a Musical Picture (1941) — Buck Privates
 Scoring of a Musical Picture (1942) — It Started With Eve (w. Hans J. Salter)
 Scoring of a Musical Picture (1944) — Song of the Open Road

Family

Parents
 Father: Rabbi Morris Previn (December 1860, Russia – 16 August 1929, Brooklyn)
 Mother: Henrietta Previn (September 1859, Germany – September 1948, New York, NY)
Morris and Henrietta were married in about 1880. Morris Previn was a rabbi at Ascha-Shorem on 78 Ten Eyck Street in Brooklyn.

Siblings
 Rosie (December 1882, Germany – May 1948, New York, NY)
 MARRIED NAMES
 Rose Meyer (married Dr. Joseph H. Meyer)
 Leo Previn (3 August 1884, Graudenz, Germany – February 1954, New York, NY)
 Arthur Gerald Previn (14 February 1886, Germany – July 1969, Falls Church, Virginia)
 Bess (born October 1892, New York City – April 30, 1983, New York City)
 MARRIED NAMES
 Bess Landau (married Saul Albert Landau 19 November 1914 Manhattan, NY)
 Bess Nathanson
 Bess Kurtzman
 Jules Previn (23 July 1894, Connecticut – January 1976, Virginia)
 William Oliver Previn (19 June 1896, New York City – 16 August 1978, Washington, D.C.)
 Stanley S. Previn (3 August 1899 – November 1973, Los Angeles)

References
General references
 Biography Index, A cumulative index to biographical material in books and magazines, Volume 1: January 1946 – July 1949, H. W. Wilson Company, New York (1949)
 Biography Index, A cumulative index to biographical material in books and magazines, Volume 10: September 1973 – August 1976, H. W. Wilson Company, New York (1977)
 Who Was Who on Screen, Third edition, by Evelyn Mack Truitt, R.R. Bowker, New York (1983)
 The ASCAP Biographical Dictionary, Third edition, American Society of Composers, Authors and Publishers, New York (1966)
 ASCAP Biographical Dictionary, Fourth edition, compiled for the American Society of Composers, Authors and Publishers, by Jaques Cattell Press, R.R. Bowker, New York (1980)
 Who's Who in Hollywood, the largest cast of international film personalities ever assembled, two volumes, by David Ragan, New York: Facts on File, New York (1992)

Inline citations

External links
 

1888 births
1973 deaths
American male conductors (music)
American film score composers
American male film score composers
American music arrangers
Jewish American film score composers
Best Original Music Score Academy Award winners
New York College of Music alumni
Cornell University alumni
Musicians from Brooklyn
Classical musicians from New York (state)
20th-century American conductors (music)
20th-century American male musicians
Previn family